Jasmin is an Indian actress who acted in a few Hindi films. Her last movie was Veerana, produced and directed by Ramsay Brothers. After this movie, she suspiciously disappeared, and nobody knows her whereabouts. Many people claim that she either committed suicide due to underworld links or died of an illness. There is another theory that she got settled abroad.

Biography
Jasmin made her debut in Bollywood in 1979 with Sarkari Mehmaan. In 1984, her film Divorce was released. In 1988, her film Veerana was released.

Filmography

See also
Lists of people who disappeared

References

External links
 

1980s missing person cases
20th-century Indian actresses
Actresses in Hindi cinema
Indian film actresses
Missing person cases in India
Place of birth missing (living people)
Year of birth missing (living people)